Artelida is a genus of beetles in the family Cerambycidae, containing the following species:

 Artelida asperata Waterhouse, 1880
 Artelida aurosericea Waterhouse, 1882
 Artelida calcarata Fairmaire, 1905
 Artelida caligata Fairmaire, 1904
 Artelida cribata Vives, 2003
 Artelida crinipes Thomson, 1864
 Artelida diversitarsis Fairmaire, 1902
 Artelida fuscosericans Fairmaire, 1902
 Artelida gracilipes Fairmaire, 1902
 Artelida holoxantha Fairmaire, 1902
 Artelida nobilitata Nonfried, 1891
 Artelida olivacea Fairmaire, 1903
 Artelida pernobilis Van de Poll, 1890
 Artelida perrieri Fairmaire, 1903
 Artelida rubicunda Fairmaire, 1903
 Artelida scutellaris Fairmaire, 1896
 Artelida villosimana Fairmaire, 1903

References

Dorcasominae